The following is a list of notable deaths in September 1993.

Entries for each day are listed alphabetically by surname. A typical entry lists information in the following sequence:
 Name, age, country of citizenship at birth, subsequent country of citizenship (if applicable), reason for notability, cause of death (if known), and reference.

September 1993

1
Hasan Abdullayev, 75, Soviet and Azerbaijani physicist and academic.
Thomas Brodie, 89, British Army officer.
Odell M. Conoley, 79, American Marine Corps brigadier general.
Fritz Cremer, 86, German sculptor.
Hew Lorimer, 86, Scottish sculptor.
Bernie Lowe, 75, American musician.
Neon Park, 52, American painter, comics artist and illustrator, ALS.
Michael Sobell, 100, British businessman, philanthropist, and thoroughbred racehorses owner.
Aleksey Vakhonin, 58, Russian weightlifter and Olympic champion, injuries sustained during brawl.

2
Eric Berry, 80, British actor, cancer.
Dragotin Cvetko, 81, Slovenian composer and musicologist.
Carl Anthony Fisher, 47, American Roman Catholic prelate, colorectal cancer.
Ingvar Moe, 56, Norwegian poet, novelist and children's writer.
Russel B. Nye, 80, American professor of English and Pulitzer Prize winner.

3
Eric Batten, 79, English rugby player.
David Brown, 89, English industrialist.
Josep Maria de Porcioles i Colomer, 89, Spanish politician and mayor of Barcelona, heart attack.
Don Corbitt, 69, American gridiron football player.

4
Tommy Cheadle, 74, English football player.
Baltasar Lobo, 83, Spanish artist, anarchist and sculptor.
Johnny Rae, 59, American jazz drummer and vibraphonist.
Hervé Villechaize, 50, French-American actor (Fantasy Island, The Man with the Golden Gun, Airplane II: The Sequel) and painter, suicide.
Aaron Wildavsky, 63, American political scientist, lung cancer.

5
Baek Du-jin, 84, South Korean politician and Prime Minister of South Korea.
Samim Kocagöz, 77, Turkish novelist.
Edwin Malindine, 83, British politician.
Virgilio Mortari, 90, Italian composer and teacher.
Claude Renoir, 79, French cinematographer.
John Truscott, 57, Australian actor and production- and costume designer, complications during heart surgery.

6
Pete Bennett, 65, Canadian football player.
Bjarne Liller, 57, Danish jazz musician, singer-songwriter, and actor.
A. L. F. Rivet, 77, British archaeologist and cartographer.
Paul Arthur Schilpp, 96, German-American philosopher and educator.

7
Eugen Barbu, 69, Romanian writer and journalist.
Hall Bartlett, 70, American film producer, director, and screenwriter.
Jean-Pierre Büchler, 85, Luxembourgian politician.
Lefty Dizz, 56, American chicago blues guitarist and singer, esophageal cancer.
Bruno Giorgi, 88, Brazilian sculptor.
Christian Metz, 61, French film theorist, suicide.

8
Vincent Dethier, 78, American physiologist and entomologist.
Peter Higgins, 64, British athlete and Olympic medalist.
Zaki Naguib Mahmoud, 88, Egyptian intellectual and philosopher.
Tor Skjønsberg, 90, Norwegian resistance leader during World War II.

9
Jimmy Deuchar, 63, Scottish jazz trumpeter and big band arranger.
Art Mooney, 80, American singer and bandleader.
Helen O'Connell, 73, American big band singer and actress, liver cancer.
David Tendlar, 84, American animator.

10
Garnet Ault, 87, Canadian swimmer and Olympic medalist.
Nicholas Bayard Dill, 87, Bermudian politician and military officer, heart attack.
Julien Freund, 72, French sociologist and philosopher.
Hajime Hana, 63, Japanese actor.
Charles Harris, 79, American tennis player.
Cal Howard, 82, American cartoon story artist and animator.
Rita Karin, 73, Polish-American actress (Sophie's Choice).
Meinrad Miltenberger, 68, German sprint canoer and Olympian.
Josef Odložil, 54, Czech middle-distance runner and Olympic medalist, complications after fight.
Krister Wickman, 69, Swedish politician.

11
Luis Antonio Escobar, 68, Colombian composer and musicologist.
Antoine Izméry, Haitian businessman and pro-democracy activist, shot.
Charles Lamont, 98, American filmmaker, pneumonia.
Erich Leinsdorf, 81, Austrian-American conductor.
Mary Jane Reoch, 48, American cycling champion, road accident.

12
Raymond Burr, 76, Canadian-American actor (Perry Mason, Rear Window, Ironside), Emmy winner (1959, 1961), kidney cancer.
Hitendra Kanaiyalal Desai, 78, Indian politician.
Baligh Hamdi, 61, Egyptian composer, liver disease.
Granny Hamner, 66, American Major League Baseball player.
Harold Innocent, 60, English actor (Henry V, Robin Hood: Prince of Thieves, Buster).
Edith Kiel, 89, German film producer, screenwriter, and director.
Walter Ganshof van der Meersch, 93, Belgian jurist and politician.

13
Austregésilo de Athayde, 94, Brazilian writer and journalist.
Steve Jordan, 74, American jazz guitarist.
Pavel Kouba, 55, Czech football player.
Yasushi Sasaki, 85, Japanese film director.
Carl Voss, 86, American ice hockey player.

14
Adrianne Allen, 86, English stage actress, cancer.
Geo Bogza, 85, Romanian avant-garde theorist, poet, and journalist.
Erling Asbjørn Kongshaug, 78, Norwegian rifle shooter and Olympic champion.
Sheelagh Murnaghan, 69, Northern Irish politician.
Glenn E. Smiley, 83, American clergyman  and civil rights leader.
Peter Tranchell, 71, British composer.
Solange Térac, 86, French screenwriter and film director.

15
Ethan Allen, 89, American baseball player.
Maurice Allingham, 97, Australian rules football player.
Pino Puglisi, 56, Italian Roman Catholic priest, killed by the mafia.
Yulian Semyonov, 61, Soviet and Russian writer, scriptwriter and poet.
Shinsaku Tsukawaki, 62, Japanese gymnast and Olympian.
Maurice Yaméogo, 71, President of Republic of Upper Volta (1959-1966).

16
František Jílek, 80, Czech conductor, composer and pianist.
Sid Kuller, 82, American comedy writer, producer and composer.
Henri LaBorde, 84, American discus thrower and Olympian.
J. R. Monterose, 66, American jazz saxophonist.
Oodgeroo Noonuccal, 72, Aboriginal Australian political activist and artist.
Vera Orlova, 75, Soviet and Russian actress.
Rok Petrovič, 27, Yugoslav and Slovenian alpine skier and Olympian, drowned.

17
Thomas Robert Shannon Broughton, 93, Canadian classical scholar and Latin prosopographer.
James Griffith, 77, American actor, musician and screenwriter, cancer.
Jon Jelacic, 56, American gridiron football player.
Willie Mosconi, 80, American  pool player, heart attack.
Christian Nyby, 80, American film director (The Thing from Another World).
Tarzie Vittachi, 71, Sri Lankan journalist, liver cancer.

18
Aris Konstantinidis, 80, Greek modernist architect.
Henrietta Leaver, 77, American beauty pageant contestant, cancer.
Hans Schwarzenbach, 80, Swiss equestrian and Olympic medalist.
Asit Sen, 76, Indian Hindi film director and comedian.

19
Helen Adam, 83, Scottish poet, collagist and photographer.
Art Burris, 69, American basketball player.
John E. Dimon, 77, American politician.
Marcel Mariën, 73, Belgian artist and filmmaker, cancer.
András Mihály, 75, Hungarian cellist, composer and academic teacher.
Mufti Muhammad Waqaruddin, 78, Pakistani Islamic scholar.

20
Edwin Blunt, 75, English football player.
Erich Hartmann, 71, German fighter pilot and most successful fighter ace during World War II, brain cancer.
Zlatko Mašek, 64, Yugoslav sports shooter and Olympian.
Leonard Parkin, 64, British television journalist and newscaster, cancer.
Hans Suess, 83, Austrian physicist.
Cyrus Leo Sulzberger II, 80, American journalist, diarist, and non-fiction writer.

21
Joe Daher, 80, American college basketball and football coach.
Fernand Ledoux, 96, Belgian-French film and theatre actor.
Antonio Quintana Simonetti, 74, Cuban modernist architect.
Francis Weldon, 80, British equestrian and Olympic champion.

22
Maurice Abravanel, 90, American classical music conductor.
Emilio Botín, 90, Spanish banker.
Niklaus Meienberg, 53, Swiss writer and investigative journalist, suicide.
Mihai Tänzer, 88, Romanian football player.

23
Tommy Bogan, 73, Scottish football player.
William Cort, 57, American actor, cancer.
Myer Galpern, 90, Scottish politician.
Koichi Hirakida, 55, Japanese swimmer and Olympic medalist.
Charles Loughlin, 79, British politician.

24
Ian Stuart Donaldson, 36, English neo-Nazi musician and frontman of punk rock band Skrewdriver, car crash.
Zita Johann, 89, Austrian-American actress.
Bruno Pontecorvo, 80, Italian and Soviet nuclear physicist, Parkinson's disease.
Tamara Talbot Rice, 89, Russian-English art historian.

25
Willy Fitz, 75, Austrian football player and coach.
Francis Raymond Fosberg, 85, American botanist.
John Moores, 97, English businessman, politician and philanthropist.
Manlio Scopigno, 67, Italian football player and coach, heart attack.

26
Nina Berberova, 92, Russian writer, fall.
Frank Dunlap, 69, Canadian football player.
Semyon Pavlovich Ivanov, 86, Soviet general and Hero of the Soviet Union.
Edith Meiser, 95, American author and actress.
John Pennel, 53, American pole vaulter, Olympian, and world record holder, cancer.

27
Paolo Caldarella, 29, Italian water polo player, motorcycle accident.
Jimmy Doolittle, 96, American military general, aviation pioneer and recipient of the Medal of Honor.
Fraser MacPherson, 65, Canadian jazz musician.
Milan Muškatirović, 59, Yugoslav water polo goalkeeper.
 Notable people killed during the Sukhumi massacre
Mamia Alasania, 50, Georgian Armed Forces colonel
Alexander Berulava, 47, Georgian journalist, writer, and human rights activist
Raul Eshba, 49, Georgian  politician
Guram Gabiskiria, 46, Georgian politician and mayor of Sukhumi
Zhiuli Shartava, 49, Georgian politician and Prime Minister of Abkhazia
Andrey Soloviev, 40, Soviet and Russian war photographer

28
Peter De Vries, 83, American editor and novelist.
Chandrashekhar Dubey, 69, Indian actor and radio personality.
Paul Giguet, 78, French racing cyclist.
Crawford Greenewalt, 91, American chemical engineer, stroke.
Galina Makarova, 73, Soviet and Belarusian theater and film actress.
Dumitru Pavlovici, 81, Romanian football player.

29
Matej Bor, 80, Slovenian writer.
Ian Burn, 53, Australian conceptual artist, drowned.
Gordon Douglas, 85, American film director and actor, cancer.
Tatjana Gsovsky, 92, German ballet dancer and choreographer.
Moses Simwala, 44, Zambian football player and coach.
Ghulam Haider Wyne, 43, Pakistani politician, murdered.

30
Ronnie Aldrich, 77, British easy listening and jazz musician, prostate cancer.
Jean Brun, 67, Swiss cyclist.
Dick Harris, 81, Australian rules football player and coach.
Alex Lyon, 61, British politician, Alzheimer's disease.
Carlo Vinci, 87, American animator.

References 

1993-09
 09